KU Law  may refer to:

Korea University Law School, a law school in the Republic of Korea.
University of Kansas School of Law, a public law school in the U.S. State of Kansas.